The adipokines, or adipocytokines (Greek , fat; , cell; and , movement) are cytokines (cell signaling proteins) secreted by adipose tissue. Some contribute to an obesity-related low-grade state of inflammation or to the development of metabolic syndrome, a constellation of diseases including, but not limited to, type 2 diabetes, cardiovascular disease and atherosclerosis. The first adipokine to be discovered was leptin in 1994.  Since that time, hundreds of adipokines have been discovered.

Members include:

 Leptin
 Adiponectin
 Apelin
 chemerin
 interleukin-6 (IL-6)
 monocyte chemotactic protein-1 (MCP-1)
 plasminogen activator inhibitor-1 (PAI-1)
 retinol binding protein 4 (RBP4)
 tumor necrosis factor-alpha (TNFα)
 visfatin
 omentin
 vaspin (SERPINA12)
 progranulin
 CTRP-4

Interleukin 8 (IL-8), interleukin 10 (IL-10), interferon gamma (IFN-γ) and inducible protein 10 (IP-10 or CXCL10) have been shown to be associated with excessive body weight.

See also 
 Adipose tissue
 Hepatokines
 Myokines

Notes

External links
 

Cytokines